Crucifixion With a Donor is a painting by Hieronymus Bosch believed to be painted between 1480 and 1485. The painting resides at Royal Museums of Fine Arts of Belgium in Brussels.

References

1480s paintings
Paintings by Hieronymus Bosch
Bosch
Paintings of the Virgin Mary
Collections of the Royal Museums of Fine Arts of Belgium